The Uranquinty Power Station is a  natural gas-fired power station located in Uranquinty, New South Wales, Australia, comprising four Siemens V94.2 gas turbines.  It is the second largest gas-fired power station in New South Wales, and is used during peak loads.

Uranquinty Power Station was the fourth power station to be constructed by NewGen Power which was jointly owned by ERM Power and Babcock & Brown Power at a cost of $500 million.

On 4 July 2008 Babcock & Brown Power announced that it had sold the Uranquinty power station for $700 million to Origin Energy.

On 19 January 2009 Origin Energy announced that the Uranquinty Power Station was commissioned with eight people employed to operate the facility.

See also

 List of power stations in New South Wales

References

External links
Uranquinty at Origin Energy website

Natural gas-fired power stations in New South Wales
Wagga Wagga
2009 establishments in Australia